RTÉ Digital Radio News was a digital radio (DAB) station from the Irish state broadcaster, RTÉ. It began broadcasting on 30 May 2007,  and was launched as part of an expansion of RTÉ's digital radio network, which now contains five digital-only stations, as well as four FM stations.

The channel broadcast the latest RTÉ Radio 1 news bulletin live, at the top of each hour, and then played this on loop until the next Radio 1 update. The station also played audio from RTÉ television's main news programmes, RTÉ News: Six One and RTÉ News: Nine O'Clock.

On 12 June 2008, RTÉ launched RTÉ News Now, (now simply called RTÉ News) which operates along the same principle as RTÉ Digital Radio News, in that it streams the most recent television news bulletin from RTÉ Television, through the RTÉ.ie website  and the RTÉ News channel on Saorview

Availability
Like all of RTÉ's radio stations, RTÉ Digital Radio News was available through the RTÉ.ie website from anywhere in the world. The channel was also available in Ireland on the DAB system, however this will not be nationally accessible until 2009 and currently only covers parts of Counties Cork, Dublin, Kildare, Limerick, Louth and Meath.

End
The station was not included in the list of permanent digital radio services to be launched by RTÉ on 1 December 2008,, and ceased broadcasting on 30 November 2008. RTÉ News, the television equivalent, continues to operate however.

See also
 Newstalk
 RTÉ News Now

References

2007 establishments in Ireland
Defunct RTÉ radio stations
Digital-only radio stations
News and talk radio stations in Ireland
Digital Radio News
RTÉ News and Current Affairs